Lepidoptera of Greenland consist of both the butterflies and moths recorded from Greenland.

According to a recent estimate, there are a total of 52 Lepidoptera species present in Greenland.

Butterflies

Lycaenidae
Lycaena phlaeas feildeni (McLachlan, 1878)
Agriades glandon aquilina (Staudinger, 1901)

Nymphalidae
Boloria polaris (Boisduval, [1828])
Boloria chariclea (Schneider, 1794)

Pieridae
Colias hecla Lefèbvre, 1836

Moths

Arctiidae
Pararctia lapponica hyperborea (Curtis, 1835)

Coleophoridae
Coleophora alticolella Zeller, 1849
Coleophora glaucicolella Wood, 1892

Crambidae
Gesneria centuriella (Denis & Schiffermüller, 1775)
Udea torvalis (Möschler, 1864)
Tehama bonifatella (Hulst, 1887)

Gelechiidae
Bryotropha similis (Stainton, 1854)
Gnorimoschema valesiella (Staudinger, 1877)
Gnorimoschema vibei Wolff, 1964
Phthorimaea operculella (Zeller, 1873)

Geometridae
Entephria polata (Duponchel, 1831)
Eupithecia gelidata Möschler, 1860
Eupithecia pusillata Denis & Schiffermüller, 1775
Operophtera bruceata (Hulst, 1886)
Psychophora sabini (Kirby, 1824)

Gracillariidae
?Phyllonorycter junoniella (Zeller, 1846)

Lymantriidae
Gynaephora groenlandica (Wocke, 1874)

Noctuidae
Apamea zeta (Treitschke, 1825)
Autographa gamma (Linnaeus, 1758)
Eurois occulta (Linnaeus, 1758)
Euxoa adumbrata drewseni (Staudinger, 1857)
Euxoa westermanni (Staudinger, 1857)
Lasionycta leucocycla (Staudinger, 1857)
Mniotype adusta (Esper, 1790)
Mniotype sommeri (Lefebvre, 1836)
Polia richardsoni (Curtis, 1835)
Rhyacia quadrangula (Zetterstedt, 1839)
Spaelotis clandestina (Harris, 1841)
Sympistis lapponica (Thunberg, 1791)
Sympistis nigrita Staudinger, 1857
Syngrapha borea (Aurivillius, 1890)
Syngrapha parilis (Hübner, 1809)
Syngrapha u-aureum (Guenée, 1852)

Oecophoridae
Agonopterix antennariella Clarke, 1941
Agonopterix heracliana (Linnaeus, 1758)
Hofmannophila pseudospretella (Stainton, 1849)

Plutellidae
Plutella xylostella (Linnaeus, 1758)
Rhigognostis senilella (Zetterstedt, 1839)

Pterophoridae
Stenoptilia mengeli Fernald, 1898

Pyralidae
Plodia interpunctella (Hübner, [1813])
Pyla fusca (Haworth, 1811)

Scythrididae
Scythris noricella (Zeller, 1843)

Tortricidae
Acleris arcticana (Guenée, 1845)
Acleris laterana (Fabricius, 1794)
Epinotia trigonella (Linnaeus, 1758)
Olethreutes mengelana (Fernald, 1894)
Olethreutes inquietana (Walker, 1863)

References
"The Lepidoptera of Greenland; Some Geographic Considerations"
Cabdirect.org: "Observations on Lepidoptera in south and southwest Greenland"

.Lepid
Lepidoptera
Greenland
Greenland
Greenland
Greenland
Greenland
Greenland